Aguirre is a little village in the municipality of Bejuma in Carabobo state, Venezuela. This village is very religious , handcrafts, agriculture, poultry and removal of lime.

References

External links
 Imagenes y fotos de Aguirre Estado de Carabobo (Images and photos of Aguirre, Carabobo)

Populated places in Carabobo